The giant panda (Ailuropoda melanoleuca, sometimes panda bear or simply panda) is a bear species endemic to China. It is characterised by its bold black-and-white coat and rotund body. The name "giant panda" is sometimes used to distinguish it from the red panda, a neighboring musteloid. Though it belongs to the order Carnivora, the giant panda is a folivore, with bamboo shoots and leaves making up more than 99% of its diet. Giant pandas in the wild occasionally eat other grasses, wild tubers, or even meat in the form of birds, rodents, or carrion. In captivity, they may receive honey, eggs, fish, yams, shrub leaves, oranges, or bananas along with specially prepared food.

The giant panda lives in a few mountain ranges in central China, mainly in Sichuan, and also in neighbouring Shaanxi and Gansu. As a result of farming, deforestation, and other development, the giant panda has been driven out of the lowland areas where it once lived, and it is a conservation-reliant vulnerable species. A 2007 report showed 239 pandas living in captivity inside China and another 27 outside the country. By December 2014, 49 giant pandas lived in captivity outside China, living in 18 zoos in 13 countries. Wild population estimates vary; one estimate shows that there are about 1,590 individuals living in the wild, while a 2006 study via DNA analysis estimated that this figure could be as high as 2,000 to 3,000. Some reports also show that the number of giant pandas in the wild is on the rise. By March 2015, the wild giant panda population had increased to 1,864 individuals. In 2016, it was reclassified on the IUCN Red List from "endangered" to "vulnerable", affirming decade-long efforts to save the panda. In July 2021, Chinese authorities also reclassified the giant panda as vulnerable.

The giant panda has often served as China's national symbol, appeared on Chinese Gold Panda coins since 1982 and as one of the five Fuwa mascots of the 2008 Summer Olympics.

Taxonomy

Classification
For many decades, the precise taxonomic classification of the giant panda was under debate because it shares characteristics with both bears and raccoons. However, molecular studies indicate the giant panda is a true bear, part of the family Ursidae. The giant panda has been referred to as a living fossil.

Etymology
The word panda was borrowed into English from French, but no conclusive explanation of the origin of the French word panda has been found. The closest candidate is the Nepali word ponya, possibly referring to the adapted wrist bone of the red panda, which is native to Nepal. The Western world originally applied this name to the red panda.

In many older sources, the name "panda" or "common panda" refers to the lesser-known red panda, thus necessitating the inclusion of "giant" and "lesser/red" prefixes in front of the names. Even in 2013, the Encyclopædia Britannica still used "giant panda" or "panda bear" for the bear, and simply "panda" for the red panda, despite the popular usage of the word "panda" to refer to giant pandas.

Since the earliest collection of Chinese writings, the Chinese language has given the bear 20 different names, such as mò ( ancient Chinese name for giant panda), huāxióng ( "spotted bear") and zhúxióng ( "bamboo bear"). The most popular names in China today are dàxióngmāo ( literally "giant bear cat"), or simply xióngmāo ( "bear cat"). The name xióngmāo ( "bear cat") was originally used to describe the red panda (Ailurus fulgens), but since the giant panda was thought to be closely related to the red panda, dàxióngmāo was named relatively.

In Taiwan, another popular name for panda is the inverted dàmāoxióng ( "giant cat bear"), though many encyclopediae and dictionaries in Taiwan still use the "bear cat" form as the correct name. Some linguists argue, in this construction, "bear" instead of "cat" is the base noun, making this name more grammatically and logically correct, which may have led to the popular choice despite official writings. This name did not gain its popularity until 1988, when a private zoo in Tainan painted a sun bear black and white and created the Tainan fake panda incident.

Subspecies

Two subspecies of giant panda have been recognized on the basis of distinct cranial measurements, colour patterns, and population genetics.
 The nominate subspecies, A. m. melanoleuca, consists of most extant populations of the giant panda. These animals are principally found in Sichuan and display the typical stark black and white contrasting colours.
The typical black and white pattern of Sichuan giant pandas is replaced with a light brown and white pattern. The skull of A. m. qinlingensis is smaller than its relatives, and it has larger molars.

A detailed study of the giant panda's genetic history from 2012 confirms that the separation of the Qinlin population occurred about 300,000 years ago, and reveals that the non-Qinlin population further diverged into two groups, named the Minshan and the Qionglai-Daxiangling-Xiaoxiangling-Liangshan group respectively, about 2,800 years ago.

Phylogeny

Description

The giant panda has a body shape typical of bears. It has black fur on its ears, eye patches, limbs and shoulders. The rest of the animal's coat is white. The bear's distinctive coat appears to serve as camouflage in both winter and summer environments. The white areas may serve as camouflage in snow, while the black shoulders and legs provide crypsis in shade. Studies in the wild have found that when viewed from a distance, the panda displays disruptive coloration while close up, they rely more on blending in. The black ears may signal aggressive intent, while the eye patches might facilitate them identifying one another. The giant panda's thick, woolly coat keeps it warm in the cool forests of its habitat. The panda's skull shape is typical of durophagous carnivorans. It has evolved from previous ancestors to exhibit larger molars with increased complexity and expanded temporal fossa. A  giant panda has a 3D canine teeth bite force of 2603.47 newtons and bite force quotient of 292. Another study had a  giant panda bite of 1298.9 newtons (BFQ 151.4) at canine teeth and 1815.9 newtons (BFQ 141.8) at carnassial teeth.

The giant panda's paw has a "thumb" and five fingers; the "thumb" – actually a modified sesamoid bone – helps it to hold bamboo while eating. Stephen Jay Gould discusses this feature in his book of essays on evolution and biology, The Panda's Thumb.

The giant panda typically lives around 20 years in the wild and up to 30 years in captivity. A female named Jia Jia was the oldest giant panda ever in captivity, born in 1978 and died at an age of 38 on 16 October 2016.

Pathology
A seven-year-old female named Jin Yi died in 2014 in a zoo in Zhengzhou, China, after showing symptoms of gastroenteritis and respiratory disease. It was found that the cause of death was toxoplasmosis, a disease caused by an obligate intracellular parasitic protozoan known as Toxoplasma gondii that infects most warm-blooded animals, including humans.

Genomics
The giant panda genome was sequenced in 2009 using Illumina dye sequencing. Its genome contains 20 pairs of autosomes and one pair of sex chromosomes.

Ecology

Diet

Despite its taxonomic classification as a carnivoran, the giant panda's diet is primarily herbivorous, consisting almost exclusively of bamboo. However, the giant panda still has the digestive system of a carnivore, as well as carnivore-specific genes, and thus derives little energy and little protein from consumption of bamboo. The ability to break down cellulose and lignin is very weak, and their main source of nutrients comes from starch and hemicelluloses. The most important part of their bamboo diet is the shoots, that are rich in starch which they have a higher capability to digest than strict carnivores, and have up to 32% protein content. During the shoot season, which lasts from April to August, they put on a lot of weight, which allows them to get through the nutrient-scarce period from late August to April, when they feed mostly on bamboo leaves. Pandas are born with sterile intestines and require bacteria obtained from their mother's feces to digest vegetation. The giant panda is a highly specialised animal with unique adaptations, and has lived in bamboo forests for millions of years.

Ingestion of such a large quantity of material is possible and necessary because of the rapid passage of large amounts of indigestible plant material through the short, straight digestive tract. It is also noted, however, that such rapid passage of digesta limits the potential of microbial digestion in the gastrointestinal tract, limiting alternative forms of digestion. Given this voluminous diet, the giant panda defecates up to 40 times a day. The limited energy input imposed on it by its diet has affected the panda's behavior. The giant panda tends to limit its social interactions and avoids steeply sloping terrain to limit its energy expenditures.

It has been estimated that an adult panda absorbs  of cyanide a day through its diet. To prevent poisoning, they have evolved anti-toxic mechanisms to protect themselves. About 80% of the cyanide is metabolized to less toxic thiocyanate and discharged in urine, while the remaining 20% is detoxified by other minor pathways.

Two of the panda's most distinctive features, its large size and round face, are adaptations to its bamboo diet. Anthropologist Russell Ciochon observed: "[much] like the vegetarian gorilla, the low body surface area to body volume [of the giant panda] is indicative of a lower metabolic rate. This lower metabolic rate and a more sedentary lifestyle allows the giant panda to subsist on nutrient poor resources such as bamboo." Similarly, the giant panda's round face is the result of powerful jaw muscles, which attach from the top of the head to the jaw. Large molars crush and grind fibrous plant material.

The morphological characteristics of extinct relatives of the giant panda suggest that while the ancient giant panda was omnivorous 7 million years ago (mya), it only became herbivorous some 2–2.4 mya with the emergence of A. microta. Genome sequencing of the giant panda suggests that the dietary switch could have initiated from the loss of the sole T1R1/T1R3 umami taste receptor, resulting from two frameshift mutations within the T1R1 exons. Umami taste corresponds to high levels of glutamate as found in meat and may have thus altered the food choice of the giant panda. Although the pseudogenisation of the umami taste receptor in Ailuropoda coincides with the dietary switch to herbivory, it is likely a result of, and not the reason for, the dietary change. The mutation time for the T1R1 gene in the giant panda is estimated to 4.2 mya while fossil evidence indicates bamboo consumption in the giant panda species at least 7 mya, signifying that although complete herbivory occurred around 2 mya, the dietary switch was initiated prior to T1R1 loss-of-function.

Pandas eat any of 25 bamboo species in the wild, such as Fargesia dracocephala and Fargesia rufa. Only a few bamboo species are widespread at the high altitudes pandas now inhabit. Bamboo leaves contain the highest protein levels; stems have less.

Because of the synchronous flowering, death, and regeneration of all bamboo within a species, the giant panda must have at least two different species available in its range to avoid starvation. While primarily herbivorous, the giant panda still retains decidedly ursine teeth and will eat meat, fish, and eggs when available. In captivity, zoos typically maintain the giant panda's bamboo diet, though some will provide specially formulated biscuits or other dietary supplements.

Pandas will travel between different habitats if they need to, so they can get the nutrients that they need and to balance their diet for reproduction. For six years, scientists studied six pandas tagged with GPS collars at the Foping Reserve in the Qinling Mountains. They took note of their foraging and mating habits and analyzed samples of their food and feces. The pandas would move from the valleys into the Qinling Mountains and would only return to the valleys in autumn. During the summer months, bamboo shoots rich in protein are only available at higher altitudes which causes low calcium rates in the pandas. During breeding season, the pandas would return to lower altitudes to eat bamboo leaves rich in calcium.

Predators
Although adult giant pandas have few natural predators other than humans, young cubs are vulnerable to attacks by snow leopards, yellow-throated martens, eagles, feral dogs, and the Asian black bear. Sub-adults weighing up to  may be vulnerable to predation by leopards.

Behavior
The giant panda is a terrestrial animal and primarily spends its life roaming and feeding in the bamboo forests of the Qinling Mountains and in the hilly province of Sichuan. Giant pandas are generally solitary. Each adult has a defined territory and a female is not tolerant of other females in her range. Social encounters occur primarily during the brief breeding season in which pandas in proximity to one another will gather. After mating, the male leaves the female alone to raise the cub.

Pandas were thought to fall into the crepuscular category, those who are active twice a day, at dawn and dusk; however, Jindong Zhang found that pandas may belong to a category all of their own, with activity peaks in the morning, afternoon and midnight. The low nutrition quality of bamboo means pandas need to eat more frequently, and due to their lack of major predators they can be active at any time of the day. Activity is highest in June and decreases in late summer to autumn with an increase from November through the following March. Activity is also directly related to the amount of sunlight during colder days.

Pandas communicate through vocalisation and scent marking such as clawing trees or spraying urine. They are able to climb and take shelter in hollow trees or rock crevices, but do not establish permanent dens. For this reason, pandas do not hibernate, which is similar to other subtropical mammals, and will instead move to elevations with warmer temperatures. Pandas rely primarily on spatial memory rather than visual memory.

Though the panda is often assumed to be docile, it has been known to attack humans, presumably out of irritation rather than aggression.

Pandas have been known to cover themselves in horse manure to protect themselves against cold temperatures.

Olfactory communication 
Giant pandas heavily rely on olfactory communication to communicate with conspecifics. Scent marks are used to spread these chemical cues and are placed on landmarks like rocks or trees. Chemical communication in giant pandas plays many roles in their social situations. Scent marks and odors are used to spread information about sexual status, whether a female is in estrus or not, age, gender, individuality, dominance over territory, and choice of settlement.

Giant pandas communicate by excreting volatile compounds, or scent marks, through the anogenital gland. These volatile compounds are found in urine and vaginal and anal secretions from the anogenital gland. The anogenital gland secretes short chain fatty acids (SCFA) and aromatics, which are present in the scent marks of giant pandas. Giant pandas have unique positions in which they will scent mark. Males deposit scent marks or urine by lifting their hind leg, rubbing their backside, or standing in order to rub the anogenital gland onto a landmark. Females; however, exercise squatting or simply rubbing their genitals onto a landmark.

The season plays a major role in mediating chemical communication. Depending on the season, mainly whether it's breeding season or not, may influence which odors are prioritized. Chemical signals can have different functions in different seasons. During the non-breeding season, females prefer the odors of other females because reproduction is not their primary motivation. However, during breeding season, odors from the opposite sex will be more attractive.

Because they are solitary mammals and their breeding season is so brief, female pandas secrete chemical cues in order to let males know their sexual status. The chemical cues female pandas secrete can be considered to be pheromones for sexual reproduction. Females deposit scent marks through their urine which induces an increase in androgen levels in males. Androgen is a sex hormone found in both males and females; testosterone is the major androgen produced by males. Civetone and decanoic acid are chemicals found in female urine which promote behavioral responses in males; both chemicals are considered giant panda pheromones. Male pandas also secrete chemical signals that include information about their sexual reproductivity and age, which is beneficial for a female when choosing a mate. For example, age can be useful for a female to determine sexual maturity and sperm quality. Pandas are also able to determine when the signal was placed, further aiding in the quest to find a potential mate. However, chemical cues are not just used for communication between males and females, pandas can determine individuality from chemical signals. This allows them to be able to differentiate between a potential partner or someone of the same sex, which could be a potential competitor.

Chemical cues, or odors, play an important role in how a panda chooses their habitat. Pandas look for conspecific odors that tell them not only the identity of another panda, but if they should avoid them or not. Pandas tend to avoid their species for most of the year, breeding season being the brief time of major interaction. Chemical signaling allows for avoidance and competition. Pandas whose habitats are in similar locations will collectively leave scent marks in a unique location which is termed "scent stations." When pandas come across these scent stations, they are able to identify a specific panda and the scope of their habitat. This allows pandas to be able to pursue a potential mate or avoid a potential competitor.

Pandas can assess an individual's dominance status, including their age and size, via odor cues and may choose to avoid a scent mark if the signaler's competitive ability outweighs their own. A pandas size can be conveyed through the height of the scent mark. Since larger animals can place higher scent marks, an elevated scent mark advertises a higher competitive ability. Age must also be taken into consideration when assessing a competitor's fighting ability. For example, a mature panda will be larger than a younger, immature panda and possess an advantage during a fight.

Reproduction

Initially, the primary method of breeding giant pandas in captivity was by artificial insemination, as they seemed to lose their interest in mating once they were captured. This led some scientists to try extreme methods, such as showing them videos of giant pandas mating and giving the males sildenafil (commonly known as Viagra). Only recently have researchers started having success with captive breeding programs, and they have now determined giant pandas have comparable breeding to some populations of the American black bear, a thriving bear species. The normal reproductive rate is considered to be one young every two years.

Giant pandas reach sexual maturity between the ages of four and eight, and may be reproductive until age 20. The mating season is between March and May, when a female goes into estrus, which lasts for two or three days and only occurs once a year. When mating, the female is in a crouching, head-down position as the male mounts her from behind. Copulation time ranges from 30 seconds to five minutes, but the male may mount her repeatedly to ensure successful fertilisation. The gestation period is somewhere between 95 and 160 days - the variability is due to the fact that the fertilized egg may linger in the reproductive system for a while before implanting on the uterine wall.

Giant pandas give birth to twins in about half of pregnancies. If twins are born, usually only one survives in the wild. The mother will select the stronger of the cubs, and the weaker cub will die due to starvation. The mother is thought to be unable to produce enough milk for two cubs since she does not store fat. The father has no part in helping raise the cub.

It nurses from its mother's breast six to 14 times a day for up to 30 minutes at a time. For three to four hours, the mother may leave the den to feed, which leaves the cub defenseless. One to two weeks after birth, the cub's skin turns grey where its hair will eventually become black. Slight pink colour may appear on the cub's fur, as a result of a chemical reaction between the fur and its mother's saliva. A month after birth, the colour pattern of the cub's fur is fully developed. Its fur is very soft and coarsens with age. The cub begins to crawl at 75 to 80 days; mothers play with their cubs by rolling and wrestling with them. The cubs can eat small quantities of bamboo after six months, though mother's milk remains the primary food source for most of the first year. Giant panda cubs weigh 45 kg (100 pounds) at one year and live with their mothers until they are 18 months to two years old. The interval between births in the wild is generally two years.

In July 2009, Chinese scientists confirmed the birth of the first cub to be successfully conceived through artificial insemination using frozen sperm. The cub was born at 07:41 on 23 July that year in Sichuan as the third cub of You You, an 11-year-old. The technique for freezing the sperm in liquid nitrogen was first developed in 1980 and the first birth was hailed as a solution to the dwindling availability of giant panda semen, which had led to inbreeding. Panda semen, which can be frozen for decades, could be shared between different zoos to save the species. It is expected that zoos in destinations such as San Diego in the United States and Mexico City will now be able to provide their own semen to inseminate more giant pandas. In August 2014, a rare birth of panda triplets was announced in China; it was the fourth of such births ever reported.

Attempts have also been made to reproduce giant pandas by interspecific pregnancy where cloned panda embryos were implanted into the uterus of an animal of another species. This has resulted in panda fetuses, but no live births.

Human use and interaction

Early references

In the past, pandas were thought to be rare and noble creatures – the Empress Dowager Bo was buried with a panda skull in her vault. The grandson of Emperor Taizong of Tang is said to have given Japan two pandas and a sheet of panda skin as a sign of goodwill. Unlike many other animals in Ancient China, pandas were rarely thought to have medical uses. The few known uses include the Sichuan tribal peoples' use of panda urine to melt accidentally swallowed needles, and the use of panda pelts to control menstruation as described in the Qin dynasty encyclopedia Erya.

The creature named mo (貘) mentioned in some ancient books has been interpreted as giant panda. The dictionary Shuowen Jiezi (Eastern Han Dynasty) says that the mo, from Shu (Sichuan), is bear-like, but yellow-and-black, although the older Erya describes mo simply as a "white leopard". The interpretation of the legendary fierce creature pixiu (貔貅) as referring to the giant panda is also common.

During the reign of the Yongle Emperor (early 15th century), his relative from Kaifeng sent him a captured zouyu (騶虞), and another zouyu was sighted in Shandong. Zouyu is a legendary "righteous" animal, which, similarly to a qilin, only appears during the rule of a benevolent and sincere monarch. It is said to be fierce as a tiger, but gentle and strictly vegetarian, and described in some books as a white tiger with black spots. Puzzled about the real zoological identity of the creature captured during the Yongle era, Dutch Sinologist J. J. L. Duyvendak exclaimed, "Can it possibly have been a Pandah?"

Western discovery
The West first learned of the giant panda on 11 March 1869, when the French missionary Armand David received a skin from a hunter. The first Westerner known to have seen a living giant panda is the German zoologist Hugo Weigold, who purchased a cub in 1916. Kermit and Theodore Roosevelt, Jr., became the first Westerners to shoot a panda, on an expedition funded by the Field Museum of Natural History in the 1920s. In 1936, Ruth Harkness became the first Westerner to bring back a live giant panda, a cub named Su Lin who went to live at the Brookfield Zoo in Chicago. In 1938, Floyd Tangier Smith captured and delivered five giant pandas to London, they arrived on 23 December aboard the SS Antenor. These five were the first on British soil and were transferred to London Zoo. One, named Grandma, only lasted a few days. She was taxidermized by E. Gerrard and Sons and sold to Leeds City Museum where she is currently on display to the public. Another, Ming, became London Zoo's first Giant Panda. Her skull is held by the Royal College of Surgeons of England.

Panda diplomacy

In the 1970s, gifts of giant pandas to American and Japanese zoos formed an important part of the diplomacy of the People's Republic of China (PRC), as it marked some of the first cultural exchanges between China and the West. This practice has been termed "panda diplomacy".

By 1984, however, pandas were no longer given as gifts. Instead, China began to offer pandas to other nations only on 10-year loans, under terms including a fee of up to US$1,000,000 per year and a provision that any cubs born during the loan are the property of China. Since 1998, because of a WWF lawsuit, the United States Fish and Wildlife Service only allows a US zoo to import a panda if the zoo can ensure that China will channel more than half of its loan fee into conservation efforts for the giant panda and its habitat. As a result of this change in policy, nearly all the pandas in the world are owned by China. The pandas leased to foreign zoos and any cubs are eventually returned to China.

In May 2005, China offered a breeding pair to Taiwan. The issue became embroiled in cross-Strait relations – both over the underlying symbolism, and over technical issues such as whether the transfer would be considered "domestic" or "international", or whether any true conservation purpose would be served by the exchange. A contest in 2006 to name the pandas was held in the mainland, resulting in the politically charged names Tuan Tuan and Yuan Yuan (from tuanyuan, meaning "reunion", i.e. "reunification"). China's offer was initially rejected by Chen Shui-bian, then President of Taiwan. However, when Ma Ying-jeou assumed the presidency in 2008, the offer was accepted, and the pandas arrived in December of that year.

Zoos

Pandas have been kept in zoos as early as the Western Han Dynasty in China, where the writer Sima Xiangru noted that the panda was the most treasured animal in the emperor's garden of exotic animals in the capital Chang'an (present Xi'an). Not until the 1950s were pandas again recorded to have been exhibited in China's zoos.

Chi Chi at the London Zoo became very popular. This influenced the World Wildlife Fund to use a panda as its symbol.

A 2006 New York Times article outlined the economics of keeping pandas, which costs five times more than keeping the next most expensive animal, an elephant. American zoos generally pay the Chinese government $1 million a year in fees, as part of a typical ten-year contract. San Diego's contract with China was to expire in 2008, but got a five-year extension at about half of the previous yearly cost. The last contract, with the Memphis Zoo in Memphis, Tennessee, ended in 2013.

Conservation
The giant panda is a vulnerable species, threatened by continued habitat loss and habitat fragmentation, and by a very low birthrate, both in the wild and in captivity. Its range is currently confined to a small portion on the western edge of its historical range, which stretched through southern and eastern China, northern Myanmar, and northern Vietnam.

The giant panda has been a target of poaching by locals since ancient times and by foreigners since it was introduced to the West. Starting in the 1930s, foreigners were unable to poach giant pandas in China because of the Second Sino-Japanese War and the Chinese Civil War, but pandas remained a source of soft furs for the locals. The population boom in China after 1949 created stress on the pandas' habitat and the subsequent famines led to the increased hunting of wildlife, including pandas. During the Cultural Revolution, all studies and conservation activities on the pandas were stopped. After the Chinese economic reform, demand for panda skins from Hong Kong and Japan led to illegal poaching for the black market, acts generally ignored by the local officials at the time.

In 1963, the PRC government set up Wolong National Nature Reserve to save the declining panda population. However, few advances in the conservation of pandas were made at the time, owing to inexperience and insufficient knowledge of ecology. Many believed the best way to save the pandas was to cage them. Because of the destruction of their natural habitat, along with segregation caused by caging, reproduction of wild pandas was severely limited. In the 1990s, however, several laws (including gun control and the removal of resident humans from the reserves) helped their chances of survival. With these renewed efforts and improved conservation methods, wild pandas have started to increase in numbers in some areas, though they still are classified as a rare species.

In 2006, scientists reported that the number of pandas living in the wild may have been underestimated at about 1,000. Previous population surveys had used conventional methods to estimate the size of the wild panda population, but using a new method that analyzes DNA from panda droppings, scientists believe the wild population may be as large as 3,000. In 2006, there were 40 panda reserves in China, compared to just 13 reserves in 1998. As the species has been reclassified to "vulnerable" since 2016, the conservation efforts are thought to be working. Furthermore, in response to this reclassification, the State Forestry Administration of China announced that they would not accordingly lower the conservation level for panda, and would instead reinforce the conservation efforts.

The giant panda is among the world's most adored and protected rare animals, and is one of the few in the world whose natural inhabitant status was able to gain a UNESCO World Heritage Site designation. The Sichuan Giant Panda Sanctuaries, located in the southwest province of Sichuan and covering seven natural reserves, were inscribed onto the World Heritage List in 2006.

Not all conservationists agree that the money spent on conserving pandas is well spent. Chris Packham has argued that the breeding of pandas in captivity is "pointless" because "there is not enough habitat left to sustain them". Packham argues that the money spent on pandas would be better spent elsewhere, and has said he would "eat the last panda if I could have all the money we have spent on panda conservation put back on the table for me to do more sensible things with". He also quoted, "The panda is possibly one of the grossest wastes of conservation money in the last half century", though he has apologised for upsetting people who like pandas. However, a 2015 paper found that the giant panda can serve as an umbrella species as the preservation of their habitat also helps other endemic species in China, including 70% of the country's forest birds, 70% of mammals and 31% of amphibians.

In 2012, Earthwatch Institute, a global nonprofit that teams volunteers with scientists to conduct important environmental research, launched a program called "On the Trail of Giant Panda". This program, based in the Wolong National Nature Reserve, allows volunteers to work up close with pandas cared for in captivity, and help them adapt to life in the wild, so that they may breed, and live longer and healthier lives. Efforts to preserve the panda bear populations in China have come at the expense of other animals in the region, including snow leopards, wolves, and dholes.

In order to improve living and mating conditions for the fragmented populations of pandas, nearly 70 natural reserves have been combined to form the Giant Panda National Park in 2020. With a size of 10,500 square miles, the park is roughly three times as large as Yellowstone National Park and incorporates the Wolong National Nature Reserve. The state-owned Bank of China helped to enable the project with US$1.5 billion.
One major aim is to permanently keep the panda population stable enough to avoid a relapse to its former IUCN Red List "endangered" status. Especially small, isolated populations run the risk of inbreeding and smaller genetic variety makes the individuals more vulnerable to various defects and genetic mutation. Allowing a larger group of individuals to roam through a larger area freely and choose from a greater variety of mates, helps to enrich genetic diversity of their offspring.

In 2020, the panda population of the new national park was already above 1,800 individuals, which is roughly 80 percent of the entire panda population in China. Establishing the new protected area in the Sichuan Province also gives various other endangered or threatened species, like the Siberian tiger, the possibility to improve their living conditions by offering them a habitat. Other species who benefit from the protection of their habitat include the snow leopard, the golden snub-nosed monkey, the red panda and the complex-toothed flying squirrel.

In July 2021, Chinese conservation authorities announced that giant pandas are no longer endangered in the wild following years of conservation efforts, with a population in the wild exceeding 1,800.

Biofuel

Microbes in panda waste are being investigated for their use in creating biofuels from bamboo and other plant materials.

Population chart

See also

Giant pandas around the world
List of giant pandas
Panda tea
Pygmy giant panda
Wildlife of China
List of endangered and protected species of China

References
Notes

Bibliography
 AFP (via Discovery Channel) (20 June 2006). Panda Numbers Exceed Expectations.
 Associated Press (via CNN) (2006). Article link.
 Catton, Chris (1990). Pandas. Christopher Helm.
 Friends of the National Zoo (2006). Panda Cam: A Nation Watches Tai Shan the Panda Cub Grow. New York: Fireside Books.
 Goodman, Brenda (12 February 2006). Pandas Eat Up Much of Zoos' Budgets. The New York Times.
 (An earlier edition is available as The Smithsonian Book of Giant Pandas, Smithsonian Institution Press, 2002, .)
 Panda Facts At a Glance (N.d.). www.wwfchina.org. WWF China.
 Ryder, Joanne (2001). Little panda: The World Welcomes Hua Mei at the San Diego Zoo. New York: Simon & Schuster.
  (There are also several later reprints)
 
 Warren, Lynne (July 2006). "Panda, Inc." National Geographic. (About Mei Xiang, Tai Shan and the Wolong Panda Research Facility in Chengdu China).

External links

BBC Nature: Giant panda news, and video clips from BBC programmes past and present.
Panda Pioneer: the release of the first captive-bred panda 'Xiang Xiang' in 2006
WWF – environmental conservation organization
Pandas International – panda conservation group
National Zoo Live Panda Cams – Baby Panda Tai Shan and mother Mei Xiang
Information from Animal Diversity
NPR News 2007/08/20 – Panda Romance Stems From Bamboo
 View the panda genome on Ensembl.
 Texts and pictures of the Panda exhibition at the Museum für Naturkunde Berlin 
iPanda-50: annotated image dataset for fine-grained panda identification on Github

 
Mammals of China
Endemic fauna of China
Clawed herbivores
Herbivorous mammals
EDGE species
Vulnerable animals
Vulnerable fauna of Asia
Articles containing video clips
Species endangered by agricultural development
Species endangered by logging
Mammals described in 1869
Taxa named by Armand David